The Federal Correctional Institution, Three Rivers (FCI Three Rivers) is a medium-security United States federal prison for male inmates in unincorporated Live Oak County, Texas. It is operated by Federal Bureau of Prisons, a division of the United States Department of Justice. The facility also has an adjacent satellite prison camp which houses minimum-security male offenders.

Notable incidents

In 2008, a riot occurred between members of rival prison gangs at FCI Three Rivers which left 22 prisoners injured and one dead. Fifteen of the injured were transported to hospitals in Corpus Christi and San Antonio. The deceased inmate was identified as 40-year-old Servando Rodriguez of Nuevo Laredo, Tamaulipas, Mexico. Sources at the prison told the San Antonio Express-News that one gang consisted of American-born Chicanos and the other of Mexican citizens known as "Paisas."

A former U.S. Bureau of Prisons correctional officer and his wife were sentenced Wednesday to federal prison for accepting bribes from the family of an inmate in exchange for taking contraband into the Federal Correction Institution in Three Rivers.

According to the Department of Justice, Joel Gonzalez admitted that from December 2012 through April 2014 he made plans to smuggle tobacco and other contraband into the FCI in exchange for cash.

His wife, Lisa Gonzalez, reportedly assisted him by arranging times and locations for receiving the contraband and the bribe payments. The DOJ said Lisa Gonzalez, who was employed by the Texas Department of Criminal Justice during the scheme, traveled with her husband to Laredo to accept the items. Joel Gonzalez would then smuggle them into the FCI on his body, the DOJ said.

Joel Gonzalez was sentenced to 24 months in prison, while his wife was ordered to serve 10 months. The couple was also ordered to serve three years of supervised release following completion of their prison sentences.

Notable inmates (current and former)

See also

List of U.S. federal prisons
Federal Bureau of Prisons
Incarceration in the United States

References

External links

"FCI Three Rivers." Federal Bureau of Prisons.

Buildings of the United States government in Texas
Federal Correctional Institutions in the United States
Buildings and structures in Live Oak County, Texas
Prisons in Texas